Christoph John (born 24 December 1958) is a German football manager and former player.

References

1958 births
Living people
German football managers
German footballers
1. FC Köln managers
1. FC Köln II players
1. FC Heidenheim players
Wuppertaler SV managers
3. Liga managers

Association footballers not categorized by position